Elachistocleis panamensis (common name: Panama humming frog) is a species of frog in the family Microhylidae. It is found in Colombia and Panama. It is common in some areas in Panama but not considered common in Colombia. It lives in open grassy areas, occasionally within forests, and can also be found in pastures and arable land. It breeds in ponds.

Diet
The species of E. panamensis consists of arachnids and insects, specifically insects of the Hymenoptera order.

References

panamensis
Amphibians of Colombia
Amphibians of Panama
Taxonomy articles created by Polbot
Amphibians described in 1948